Conradia cingulifera is a species of small sea snail or micromollusc, a marine gastropod mollusc in the family Conradiidae.

Distribution
This marine species occurs off Japan.

References

 Higo, S., Callomon, P. & Goto, Y. (1999) Catalogue and Bibliography of the Marine Shell-Bearing Mollusca of Japan. Elle Scientific Publications, Yao, Japan, 749 pp.

External links
 To World Register of Marine Species

cingulifera
Gastropods described in 1860